Peter Stanley Lyons (6 December 1927 – 28 November 2006) was an English Marxist choral conductor and a headmaster of Witham Hall School.

Early life
Peter Stanley Lyons was born in Atherfold Road, London, SW9, to Harold Lyons, who was the sommelier at London's Savoy Hotel and Dorchester Hotel. Peter was educated at Alleyn's School, and at Rossall School, where he was Captain of Soccer, and at St John’s College, Cambridge. He won a choral scholarship to St John's in 1946, but completed National Service in the Royal Corps of Signals, with whom he boxed for the British Army, and in the Royal Regiment of Artillery, before he in 1948 entered Cambridge University  where he read Modern Languages without honours (BA 1950, MA 1955) and was tutored by C. W. Guillebaud. Lyons was awarded St. John's College Cambridge Colours for Soccer during the 1949 - 1950 season, and was a member of the team that won the Inter-Collegiate Cup for Soccer.

Lyons was a member of the Choir of St John's College, Cambridge under Robin Orr. He sung counter-tenor until his twenties and was described as a ‘forerunner of [Maria] Callas' whilst he was at Rossall School. His performances included the part of Euridice in Gluck's Orfeo ed Euridice, and the soprano part in Verdi's Requiem. Lyons was broadcast on the BBC on 8 February 1944. Lyons enjoyed the compositions of W. S. Gilbert and Arthur Sullivan. Peter at Alleyn’s School formed a lifetime friendship with John Lanchbery, who would become Principal Conductor of the Royal Ballet from 1959 to 1972, and with Kenneth Spring, who would become co-founder of the National Youth Theatre of Great Britain.

Lyons was a cricketer for the Marylebone Cricket Club (MCC), for which he played during the 1960s; and for the Jesters Cricket Club; and for the Dulwich Public Schools Association.

Music career
Lyons was:

 Chorister of the Choir of St John's College, Cambridge (1948 – 1950).
 Director of Music, Royal Naval College, Greenwich (1950 – 1954)
 Director of Music, Vanbrugh Castle School (1950 – 1954)
 Director of Music and Deputy Headmaster, Wells Cathedral School, and Master of the Choristers, Wells Cathedral, (1954 – 1960)
 Headmaster, Witham Hall School (1961 - 1989)

Witham Hall
Lyons was appointed Headmaster of Witham Hall School in 1961, which was two years after that School's foundation. Witham Hall School's number of pupils increased from 20 at the time at which Lyons started, in 1961, to 150 by the time that he retired, in 1989, when that School was a feeder school for Oundle School, and for Uppingham School, and for Oakham School. Witham Hall School was during Lyons's tenure inspected by the Ministry of Education and granted the status of a trust, in 1978; and began to admit girls, from 1983. Witham Hall School has a school house, Lyons, that is named after Peter Lyons, and had a sports-hall that was named the 'Lyons Hall' that was demolished in 2016.

Marriage
On 31 July 1957, at Wells Cathedral, Lyons married Bridget Webb-Jones, who was the daughter of the choral conductor James W. Webb-Jones and of Barbara Moody (who was the daughter of Colonel Richard S. Hawks Moody CB). Bridget Webb-Jones's godmother was Lady Walford Davies, who was the wife of composer Sir Henry Walford Davies, who had composed his choral work God Be in My Head at Witham Hall, and who was subsequently the wife of Julian Harold Legge Lambart, Vice-Provost of Eton College (from 1959 to 1967) for which Witham Hall is a preparatory school. Peter and all three of Bridget's progeny endorsed Marxism. Peter and Bridget had four grandchildren.

Later life
Lyons was a member of the Young Musicians Support Group of the Dartington Hall Trust of which Imogen Holst (who was the only child of the composer Gustav Holst) was a member. Lyons died on 28 December 2006.

References

1927 births
2006 deaths
People educated at Alleyn's School
People educated at Rossall School
Alumni of St John's College, Cambridge
Royal Artillery officers
Royal Corps of Signals officers
Countertenors
English operatic tenors
English choral conductors
British male conductors (music)
Academics of the Royal Naval College, Greenwich
English classical organists
British male organists
Cathedral organists
English patrons of music
English cricketers
Marylebone Cricket Club cricketers
20th-century organists
20th-century English male singers
20th-century English singers
20th-century British conductors (music)
20th-century British Army personnel
Male classical organists